is located in Kyōtango, Kyōto Prefecture, Japan. It is a nationally designated Natural Monument and Place of Scenic Beauty, and forms part of the Tango-Amanohashidate-Ōeyama Quasi-National Park. In 1996, the Ministry of the Environment selected the sound of the sands as one of the 100 Soundscapes of Japan. Its name refers to playing the koto stringed musical instrument.

See also

 Koto
 The 100 Views of Nature in Kansai
 Singing sand

References

Beaches of Japan
Landforms of Kyoto Prefecture
Places of Scenic Beauty
Natural monuments of Japan